Simone Bagnoli (born December 6, 1981) is an Italian professional basketball player. Standing at 2.05 m (6 ft 9 in), he plays at the center position in Serie B Basket. In 2004-05 he was elected the best Italian player in Legadue.

Professional career
Career:

1999: Giulianova

1999-2000: Roseto

2000-2002 Crabs Rimini

2002-2005 NSB Rieti

2005-2006 Crabs Rimini

2006-2007 NSB Rieti

2007 Pall. Pavia

2007-2008 Virtus Roma

2008 Pall. Pavia

2008-2009 Basket Livorno

2009-2010 Seb. B.C. Rieti

2010-2011 Potenza

2011-2012 Seb. B.C. Rieti

2012 Basket Scauri

2012-2013 Amaranto e Celeste Rieti

2014-2015 Basket Scauri

See also
Lega Basket

External links
 Virtus Cassino buys Simone Bagnoli
 Post-game interview
 Italian Tv Interview
 Simone Bagnoli in Eurolega

1981 births
Living people
Italian men's basketball players
Centers (basketball)